Baron: The Real Estate Simulation is a 1983 video game published by Blue Chip Software.

Gameplay
Baron is a game in which 60 months of real estate is played in a one hour session.

Reception
Johnny Wilson reviewed the game for Computer Gaming World, and stated that "I question whether it is probable that the housing market would be down at the same time as interest rates are down, yet Baron afforded me that frustrating environment. I would certainly like to see some of the figures on the data collection for the correlation between interest rates and the market."

Reviews
PC Magazine - Feb 19, 1985

References

External links
Review in Softalk
Review in Electronic Games
Article in MacUser
Article in Family Computing

1983 video games
Apple II games
Atari 8-bit family games
Business simulation games
Classic Mac OS games
Commodore 64 games
DOS games
Video games developed in the United States
Video games set in the United States